For the Autonomies (Aut) is a heterogeneous, mostly centrist, centre-left and regionalist, parliamentary group which has been active, with slightly different names and compositions, in the Italian Senate since 2001.

History
The group was formed in May 2001 by six senators representing the northern special-statute autonomous regions of Trentino-Alto Adige/Südtirol (composed of two autonomous provinces, Trentino and South Tyrol) and Aosta Valley, two senators of European Democracy (DE) and senators for life Giulio Andreotti (a long-time Christian Democrat, who was then a member of DE too) and Gianni Agnelli. Instrumental in the formation of the group were Helga Thaler Ausserhofer, who served also as its first president, and Andreotti: the two formed a friendship and a strong political bond, despite their different geographical and political backgrounds.

The group has since been home for the regionalist parties usually affiliated with the centre-left Olive Tree (Ulivo) coalition and, later, the Democratic Party (PD), including the South Tyrolean People's Party (SVP), the Trentino Tyrolean Autonomist Party (PATT), the Union for Trentino (UpT), the Valdostan Union (UV) and Valdostan Renewal (RV), and most senators for life, including Andreotti (2001–2006, 2008–2013), Agnelli (2001–2003), Francesco Cossiga (2003–2006, 2008–2010), Emilio Colombo (2008–2013), Carlo Rubbia (2013–2018), Elena Cattaneo (2013–present), Giorgio Napolitano (2015–present), Carlo Azeglio Ciampi (2015–2016), Renzo Piano (2015–2018) and Carlo Rubbia (2022–present).

In 2006–2008 the group survived thanks to the participation of six senators of the would-be PD. In 2008–2013 it welcomed the Union of the Centre (UdC), the Associative Movement Italians Abroad (MAIE) and some centre-right independent or minor-party senators; during that parliamentary term the group saw also the return of Andreotti and Cossiga. In 2013–2018 the group notably welcomed the senators of the Italian Socialist Party (PSI) and, since 2014, those of Solidary Democracy (DeS). Most recently, from 2018 to 2022, the group featured also Pier Ferdinando Casini (Centrists for Europe–CP), who has continuously served in Parliament since 1983.

Composition

2022–present

2018–2022

2013–2018
<div style=display:inline-table>

2008–2013

Leadership
President: Helga Thaler Ausserhofer (SVP, 2001–2006), Oskar Peterlini (SVP, 2006–2008), Gianpiero D'Alia (UdC, 2008–2013), Karl Zeller (SVP, 2013–2018), Julia Unterberger (SVP, 2018–present)

References

Parliamentary groups in Italy